Xitiangezhuang Town is a town located in the Miyun District of Beijing, China. It lies on the north of Bai River's alluvial plain. The town borders Shicheng Town in the north, Xiwengzhuang and Miyun Towns in the east, Shilipu Town in the south, as well as Beifang and Huaibei Towns in the west. It had a total population of 33,702 as of 2020.

The name Xitiangezhuang comes from Xitiangezhuang Village, the place where the town's government is seated.

History

Administrative divisions 
At the time of writing, Xitiangezhuang Town comprised 37 subdivisions, with these 3 communities and 34 villages:

See also 

 List of township-level divisions of Beijing

References

Miyun District
Towns in Beijing